Justice Ogden may refer to:

Abner Nash Ogden (1809–1875), associate justice of the Louisiana Supreme Court
Elias B. D. Ogden (1800–1865), associate justice of the New Jersey Supreme Court
Wesley Ogden (1818–1896), associate justice of the Texas Supreme Court

See also 
Ogden (disambiguation)